Valea Bisericii may refer to several places in Romania:

 Valea Bisericii, a village in Samarinești Commune, Gorj County
 Valea Bisericii, a village in Drăgoești Commune, Ialomița County
 Valea Bisericii, a tributary of the Colceag in Ialomița County, Romania
 Valea Bisericii, a tributary of the Cristur in Hunedoara County, Romania